Electric Circus is a Canadian television program.

Electric Circus may also refer to:

 Electric Circus (album), by the rapper Common
 Electric Circus (nightclub), a nightclub in Manhattan
 Electric Circus, Manchester, a punk rock venue in 1970s
 "Electric Circus", a song by Thee Michelle Gun Elephant
 Electric Circus, an entertainment segment running on BBC children's Saturday morning show Live & Kicking

See also
 Inside the Electric Circus, a 1986 album by W.A.S.P.